This is a list of Spanish actors.



A 
Encarna Abad
Victoria Abril (1959)
Emilio Aragón Álvarez
Elena Anaya (1975)
Aron Piper

B 
Antonio Banderas (1960)
Javier Bardem (1969)
Jaime Blanch (1940)
Carmen Bonaplata (1871–1911), operatic soprano
Juan Diego Botto (1975)
Celso Bugallo (1947)

C 
Armando Calvo (1919–1996)
Toni Cantó
Mario Casas
 Estrellita Castro
Oona Chaplin (1986)
Mark Consuelos (1970)
Jan Cornet
Penélope Cruz (1974)

E 
Luis Escobar (1908–1991)
Manolo Escobar
Ester Expósito (2000)

F 
Angelines Fernández (1922–1994)
Fernando Fernán-Gómez (1921–2007)
Alba Flores (1986)

G 
Sancho Gracia (1936–2012)

K 
Dafne Keen (2005)

L 
Alfredo Landa (1933–2013)
Sergi López (1965)

M 
Carmen Maura (1945)
Jesús Mosquera (1993)
Jordi Mollá (1968)
Sara Montiel (1928–2013)
Amparo Muñoz

N 
Paul Naschy (1934–2009)
Conchita Núñez (1943–2009)

P 
Marisa Paredes (1946)
Elsa Pataky
Danna Paola

R 
Francisco Rabal (1926–2001)
Fernando Rey (1917–1994)
Álvaro Rico (1996)

S 
Aitana Sánchez-Gijón (1968)
Fernando Sancho (1916–1990)
Ines Sastre
Ariadna Sintes

V 
Paz Vega (1976)

See also
 List of Spaniards

References

 
Actors
Spain